The European Union Studies Association (EUSA) (founded 1988) is a scholarly and professional association with its focus on the European Union, the processes of its integration, and its transatlantic relations.

It notes valuable contributions to European Studies via various prizes including the EUSA Award for Lifetime Achievement in European Studies.

Leadership

2021-2023 Executive Committee 

 Sara Wallace Goodman Chair
 Elaine Fahey
 Stephanie Hofmann
 Dan Kelemen (Chair 2024-2025)
 Sophie Meunier (Chair 2023-2024)
 Kaija Schilde
 Milada Vachudova
 Jae-Jae Spoon ex officio

EUSA Chairs from Inception to Present 

 Glenda G. Rosenthal 1989–1990
 Roy H. Ginsberg 1990–1992
 Pierre-Henri Laurent 1992–1993
 Alberta Sbragia 1993–1995
 James A. Caporaso 1995–1997
 Gary Marks 1997–1999
 Vivien A. Schmidt 1999–2001
 Martin A. Schain 2001–2003
 George Ross 2003–2005
 John T.S. Keeler 2005–2007
 Liesbet Hooghe 2007–2009
 Adrienne Héritier 2009-2011
 Amie Kreppel 2011-2013
 Michelle Egan 2013-2015
 Alasdair Young 2015-2017
 Abe Newman   2017-2019
 Matthias Matthijs   2019-2021
 Sara Wallace Goodman 2021-2023
 Sophie Meunier   2023-2024
 Dan Kelemen 2024-2025

Lifetime Achievement in European Studies Award winners 
 2023 Brigid Laffan
 2021 Helen Wallace
 2019 Vivien Schmidt
 2017 George Ross
 2015 James Caporaso
 2013 Alberta Sbragia
 2011 Jeremy Richardson
 2009 Philippe C. Schmitter 
 2007 Fritz W. Scharpf
 2005 Eric Stein 
 2001-2003 Stanley Hoffmann 
 1999-2001 Leon Lindberg
 1997-1999 Ernst B. Haas

References

Pan-European learned societies